Oscadytes rovirai is a species of beetle in the family Carabidae, the only species in the genus Oscadytes.

References

Pterostichinae